The 2014 United States House of Representatives elections in Louisiana were held on Tuesday, November 4, 2014 to elect the six U.S. representatives from the state of Louisiana, one from each of the state's six congressional districts. The elections coincided with the elections of other federal and state offices, including the United States Senate.

Under Louisiana's jungle primary system, all candidates appeared on the same ballot, regardless of party. If no candidate received 50 percent plus one vote during the primary election, a runoff election will be held on December 6, 2014, between the top two candidates in the primary.

Overview
Results of the 2014 United States House of Representatives elections in Louisiana by district:

District 1

Republican incumbent Steve Scalise, who has represented the 1st district since 2008, considered running for the U.S. Senate, but instead ran for re-election. He faced Democrats Lee A. Dugas and M. V. "Vinny" Mendoza and Libertarian Jeffry "Jeff" Sanford in the election.

District 2

Democratic incumbent Cedric Richmond, who has represented the 2nd district since 2011, ran for re-election. He faced Democrat Gary Landrieu, Libertarian Samuel Davenport and Independent David Brooks in the election. Democrat Rufus H. Johnson had filed to run, but was disqualified following a lawsuit from Richmond's campaign.

District 3

Republican incumbent Charles Boustany, who has represented the 3rd district since 2013, and previously represented the 7th district from 2005 to 2013, considered running for the U.S. Senate, but instead ran for re-election. He faced Republican Bryan Barrilleaux and Independent Russell Richard in the election.

District 4

Republican incumbent John Fleming, who has represented the 4th district since 2009, considered running for the U.S. Senate, but instead ran for re-election. He faced Libertarian Randall Lord in the election. Democrat Justin Ansley had been running, but withdrew from the race.

District 5

The incumbent is Republican Vance McAllister, who had represented the district since winning a special election in 2013. In early April 2014, following the release of a video that showed the married McAllister kissing a female staffer who was the wife of a friend, McAllister faced calls for him to resign, which he resisted. Though he initially said that he planned to run for re-election, on April 28, 2014, he announced that he would serve out his term and not run for re-election. However, he later changed his mind and ran for re-election. He did not survive the "top two" primary and was eliminated from the runoff election on December 6.

Candidates

Republican
Declared
 Ralph Abraham, Mangham physician
 Harris Brown, Monroe businessman and son of former State Senator William Denis Brown, III
 Zach Dasher, pharmaceutical representative and first cousin of the Robertson family
 Clyde C. Holloway, Public Service Commissioner, former U.S. Representative and candidate for the seat in 2013
 Vance McAllister, incumbent U.S. Representative
 Ed Tarpley, Alexandria lawyer and former Grant Parish District Attorney and candidate for Louisiana Attorney General in 1995

Withdrew
 Jeff Guerriero, attorney

Declined
 Rodney Alexander, former secretary of the Louisiana Department of Veterans Affairs and former U.S. Representative
 Charles "Bubba" Chaney, state representative
 Elbert Guillory, state senator
 Chris Hazel, state representative
 Frank A. Hoffmann, state representative
 Jay Morris, state representative and candidate for the seat in 2013
 Neil Riser, state senator and candidate for the seat in 2013
 Adam Terry, McAllister's chief of staff
 Mike Walsworth, state senator

Democratic
Declared
 Jamie Mayo, Mayor of Monroe and candidate for the seat in 2013

Declined
 Marcus Hunter, state representative and candidate for the seat in 2013
 Bob Johnson, state representative and candidate for the seat in 2013
 Jacques Roy, Mayor of Alexandria

Libertarian
Declared
 Charles Saucier

Withdrew
 Clay Grant, businessman and candidate for the seat in 2012

Green
Declared
 Eliot Barron, realtor, Red Cross volunteer and veteran

Jungle primary

Polling

Jungle primary with McAllister and Riser

Jungle primary without McAllister

Results

Runoff

Polling

 * Internal poll for the Ralph Abraham campaign

Neither having received 50% in the primary, Mayo and Abraham will face each other in the runoff.

Results

District 6

Incumbent Republican Bill Cassidy, who had represented the 6th district since 2009, ran for the United States Senate seat then held by Mary Landrieu.

Candidates

Republican
Declared
  Bob Bell, Tea Party activist and retired U.S Navy captain
 Dan Claitor, state senator
 Norm Clark, disabled veteran and Ph.D. candidate in LSU's political science program
 Paul Dietzel, businessman
 Garret Graves, former adviser to Governor Bobby Jindal
 Craig McCulloch, physical therapist and businessman
 Charles "Trey" Thomas, LSU Tigers football player
 Lenar Whitney, state representative

Withdrew
 Cassie Felder, attorney (endorsed Dan Claitor)

Declined
 Bill Cassidy, incumbent U.S. Representative (running for U.S. Senate)
 Hunter Greene, state representative
 Ryan Heck, Baton Rouge Metro Councilman
 Shelley Hendrix, autism awareness advocate
 Jeff Landry, former U.S. Representative (running for Attorney General of Louisiana in 2015)
 Erich Ponti, state representative
 Chas Roemer, president of the Louisiana Board of Elementary and Secondary Education

Democratic
Declared
 Edwin Edwards, former Governor of Louisiana and former U.S. Representative
 Richard Dean Lieberman, real estate broker
 Peter Williams

Declined
 Quentin Anderson, resource development campaign manager for the Capital Area United Way
 Ted James, state representative

Libertarian
Declared
 Rufus Holt Craig, Jr., attorney, Democratic candidate for the seat in 2004 and Libertarian candidate for the seat in 2012

Jungle primary

Polling

Results

Runoff

Neither having achieved 50% of the popular in the primary, Edwards and Graves contested in a runoff election.

Results

See also
 2014 United States House of Representatives elections
 2014 United States elections

References

External links
U.S. House elections in Louisiana, 2014 at Ballotpedia
Campaign contributions at OpenSecrets

Louisiana
2014
United States House of Representatives